The Independent Trade Unions of Croatia (NHS) is a trade union centre in Croatia.

External links
 www.nhs.hr

References

Trade unions in Croatia
Trade unions established in 1992